Parsi is a village in West Champaran district in the Indian state of Bihar.

Demographics
As of 2011 India census, Parsi had a population of 1954 in 324 households. Males constitute 53.9% of the population and females 46%. Parsi has an average literacy rate of 39.8%, lower than the national average of 74%: male literacy is 71.1%, and female literacy is 28.8%. In Parsi, 22.5% of the population is under 6 years of age.

References

Villages in West Champaran district